Kadsura is a genus of woody vines in the Schisandraceae described as a genus in 1810.

Distribution
Kadsura is native to eastern, southern, and southeastern Asia from Sri Lanka eastwards to the Philippines, and from southern Korea and Japan southwards to Java and the Lesser Sunda Islands, with the largest species diversity in China.

Kadsura subgenus Cosbaea (Lemaire) Y.-W. Law 
Kadsura coccinea (southern China, northern Indochina)
Kadsura subgenus Kadsura
Kadsura subgenus Kadsura section Kadsura
Kadsura induta (Yunnan, Guangxi, Vietnam)
Kadsura renchangiana (Guangxi)
Kadsura heteroclita (China, Indian Subcontinent, Indochina, Borneo, Sumatra)
Kadsura longipedunculata (China)
Kadsura oblongifolia (Guangxi, Guangdong, Hainan)
Kadsura japonica (Japan, Korea, Nansei-shoto, Taiwan)
Kadsura philippinensis (Philippines)
Kadsura angustifolia (Guangxi, Vietnam)
Kadsura subgenus Kadsura section Sarcocarpon (Blume) A. C. Smith,
Kadsura acsmithii (Borneo)
Kadsura borneensis (Sabah)
Kadsura celebica (Sulawesi)
Kadsura lanceolata (Malaysia, Borneo, Sumatra, Sulawesi, Maluku)
Kadsura marmorata (Borneo, Philippines)
Kadsura scandens (Pen Malaysia, Sumatra, Java, Bali)
Kadsura verrucosa (Laos, Vietnam, Pen Malaysia, Sumatra, Java)

These species were formerly included in Kadsura but have now been moved to Schisandra
 K. chinensis - Schisandra chinensis  
 K. grandiflora - Schisandra grandiflora 
 K. propinqua - Schisandra propinqua

References

External links
 
 

 
Angiosperm genera